Tom Christensen (born 1 August 1944) is a Norwegian ice hockey player. He was born in Oslo, Norway and represented the club Vålerengens IF. He played for the Norwegian national ice hockey team, and  participated at the Winter Olympics in Sapporo in 1972, where the Norwegian team placed 8th.

References

External links

1944 births
Living people
Ice hockey players at the 1972 Winter Olympics
Norwegian ice hockey players
Olympic ice hockey players of Norway
Ice hockey people from Oslo